In Unix-like operating systems,  and  are special files that serve as cryptographically secure pseudorandom number generators. They allow access to environmental noise collected from device drivers and other sources.    typically blocked if there was less entropy available than requested; more recently (see below for the differences between operating systems) it usually blocks at startup until sufficient entropy has been gathered, then unblocks permanently. The  device typically was never a blocking device, even if the pseudorandom number generator seed was not fully initialized with entropy since boot.

Linux

Random number generation in kernel space was implemented for the first time for Linux in 1994 by Theodore Ts'o.
The implementation used secure hashes rather than ciphers, to avoid cryptography export restrictions that were in place when the generator was originally designed. The implementation was also designed with the assumption that any given hash or cipher might eventually be found to be weak, and so the design is durable in the face of any such weaknesses. Fast recovery from pool compromise is not considered a requirement, because the requirements for pool compromise are sufficient for much easier and more direct attacks on unrelated parts of the operating system.

In Ts'o's implementation, the generator keeps an estimate of the number of bits of noise in the entropy pool. From this entropy pool random numbers are created. When read, the  device will only return random bytes within the estimated number of bits of noise in the entropy pool.  When the entropy pool is empty, reads from  will block until additional environmental noise is gathered. The intent is to serve as a cryptographically secure pseudorandom number generator, delivering output with entropy as large as possible. This is suggested by the authors for use in generating cryptographic keys for high-value or long-term protection.

However such an attack is unlikely to come into existence, because once the entropy pool is unpredictable it doesn't leak security by a reduced number of bits.

This allows any user to mix random data into the pool. Non-random data is harmless, because only a privileged user can issue the ioctl needed to increase the entropy estimate.

Gutterman, Pinkas, & Reinman in March 2006 published a detailed cryptographic analysis of the Linux random number generator in which they describe several weaknesses. Perhaps the most severe issue they report is with embedded or Live CD systems, such as routers and diskless clients, for which the bootup state is predictable and the available supply of entropy from the environment may be limited. For a system with non-volatile memory, they recommend saving some state from the RNG at shutdown so that it can be included in the RNG state on the next reboot. In the case of a router for which network traffic represents the primary available source of entropy, they note that saving state across reboots "would require potential attackers to either eavesdrop on all network traffic" from when the router is first put into service, or obtain direct access to the router's internal state. This issue, they note, is particularly critical in the case of a wireless router whose network traffic can be captured from a distance, and which may be using the RNG to generate keys for data encryption.

The Linux kernel provides support for several hardware random number generators, should they be installed.

With Linux kernel 3.16 and newer, the kernel itself mixes data from hardware random number generators into  on a sliding scale based on the definable entropy estimation quality of the HWRNG. With Linux kernel 3.17+, the VirtIO RNG was modified to have a default quality defined above 0, and as such, is currently the only HWRNG mixed into  by default.

The diehard tests programs ,  and  can test these random number generators.

In January 2014, Daniel J. Bernstein published a critique of how Linux mixes different sources of entropy.  He outlines an attack in which one source of entropy capable of monitoring the other sources of entropy could modify its output to nullify the randomness of the other sources of entropy.  Consider the function  where H is a hash function and x, y, and z are sources of entropy with z being the output of a CPU based malicious HRNG Z:
 Z generates a random value of r.
 Z computes .
 Else, repeat starting at 1.
Bernstein estimated that an attacker would need to repeat  16 times to compromise DSA and ECDSA.  This is possible because Linux reseeds H on an ongoing basis instead of using a single high quality seed.

In October 2016, with the release of Linux kernel version 4.8, the kernel's  was switched over to a ChaCha20-based cryptographic pseudorandom number generator (CPRNG) implementation by Theodore Ts'o, based on Bernstein's well-regarded stream cipher ChaCha20.

In 2020, the Linux kernel version 5.6  only blocks when the CPRNG hasn't initialized. Once initialized,  and  behave the same.

BSD systems
Both block only until properly seeded. FreeBSD's PRNG (Fortuna) reseeds regularly, and does not attempt to estimate entropy. On a system with small amount of network and disk activity, reseeding is done after a fraction of a second.

Since OpenBSD 5.1 (May 1, 2012)  and  used an algorithm based on RC4 but renamed to ARC4 because of intellectual property reasons. While random number generation here uses system entropy gathered in several ways, the ARC4 algorithm provides a fail-safe, ensuring that a rapid and high quality pseudo-random number stream is provided even when the pool is in a low entropy state. The system automatically uses hardware random number generators (such as those provided on some Intel PCI hubs) if they are available, through the OpenBSD Cryptographic Framework. As of OpenBSD 5.5 (May 1, 2014), the  call used for OpenBSD's random devices no longer uses ARC4, but ChaCha20 (arc4random name might be reconsidered as A Replacement Call for Random).  was removed in OpenBSD 6.3 (April 15, 2018).

NetBSD's implementation of the legacy  API has been switched over to ChaCha20 as well.

macOS, iOS and other Apple OSes
All Apple OSes have moved to Fortuna since at least December 2019, possibly earlier. It is based on SHA-256.  Multiple entropy sources such as the secure enclave RNG, boot phase timing jitter, hardware interrupt (timing assumed) are used.  RDSEED/RDRAND is used on Intel-based Macs that support it.  Seed (entropy) data is also stored for subsequent reboots.

Prior to the change, macOS and iOS used 160-bit Yarrow based on SHA-1.

Other operating systems
NetBSD,
Tru64 UNIX 5.1B, AIX 5.2 and HP-UX 11i v2. As with FreeBSD, AIX implements its own Yarrow-based design, however AIX uses considerably fewer entropy sources than the standard  implementation and stops refilling the pool when it thinks it contains enough entropy.

The documented methods to generate cryptographically random bytes are CryptGenRandom and RtlGenRandom. Windows PowerShell provides access to a cryptographically secure pseudorandom number generator via the  cmdlet.

See also
 CryptGenRandom – The Microsoft Windows API's CSPRNG
 
 Entropy-supplying system calls
 Fortuna algorithm
 Hardware random number generator
 Standard streams

References

External links
 
 

Unix file system technology
Device file
Random number generation